The 2015 USTA Tennis Classic of Macon was a professional tennis tournament played on outdoor hard courts. It was the third edition of the tournament and part of the 2015 ITF Women's Circuit, offering a total of $50,000 in prize money. It took place in Macon, Georgia, United States, on 26 October–1 November 2015.

Singles main draw entrants

Seeds 

 1 Rankings as of 19 October 2015

Other entrants 
The following players received wildcards into the singles main draw:
  Robin Anderson
  Nicole Frenkel
  Alexa Guarachi
  Sofia Kenin

The following players received entry from the qualifying draw:
  Jacqueline Cako
  Michaela Gordon
  Diāna Marcinkēviča
  Nadia Podoroska

Champions

Singles

 Rebecca Peterson def.  Anna Tatishvili, 6–3, 4–6, 6–1

Doubles

 Jan Abaza /  Viktorija Golubic def.  Paula Cristina Gonçalves /  Sanaz Marand, 7–6(7–3), 7–5

External links 
 2015 USTA Tennis Classic of Macon at ITFtennis.com
 

2015 ITF Women's Circuit
2015
macon